Steven Knight  (born 1 April 1959) is a British screenwriter, film and television producer and director. Knight wrote the screenplays for the films Closed Circuit, Dirty Pretty Things, and Eastern Promises, and also wrote and directed the films Locke and Hummingbird (a.k.a. Redemption).

Knight is also one of three creators of Who Wants to Be a Millionaire?, a game show that has been remade and aired in around 160 countries worldwide, and has written for BBC's Commercial Breakdown, The Detectives, Peaky Blinders, See and Taboo.

Early life and education
Knight's father was a blacksmith. He attended The Streetly School (now The Streetly Academy) as a teenager, in Streetly, Walsall, in the West Midlands. He then went on to study English at University College London (UCL) where he is an Honorary Fellow. His first experience of writing was in preparing property descriptions for an Estate Agent.

Knight has three children. He is an ardent Birmingham City fan.

Career

Screenplays
Knight is best known for screenplays he wrote for the films Dirty Pretty Things and Eastern Promises. His work on the screenplay for Dirty Pretty Things earned him the Edgar Award for Best Motion Picture Screenplay and London Film Critics Circle award for British Screenwriter of the Year. The screenplay was also nominated for several other awards including the Academy Award for Writing Original Screenplay and the BAFTA Award for Best Original Screenplay.

Knight wrote the screenplay for the 2013 film Closed Circuit, which was directed by John Crowley and which starred Eric Bana and Rebecca Hall.

Knight wrote a draft of a screenplay based on the book Shutter Island written by Dennis Lehane, but the draft that was used for the movie of the same name was written by Laeta Kalogridis.

Recent films based on screenplays that Knight has written include The Hundred-Foot Journey directed by Lasse Hallström, based on the book of the same name by Richard C. Morais, and starring Helen Mirren, Seventh Son, an adventure story starring Jeff Bridges, Julianne Moore, Djimon Hounsou, Kit Harington and Jason Scott Lee, as well as the film Pawn Sacrifice, based on U.S. chess champion Bobby Fischer, with Tobey Maguire playing Fischer in the film. He also wrote the screenplay of World War Z II.

Knight wrote the script for the 2021 dramedy Locked Down, about a couple (Anne Hathaway and Chiwetel Ejiofor) attempting a high-stakes jewellery heist during the COVID-19 pandemic. Knight later wrote the script for the film Spencer, starring Kristen Stewart as Diana, Princess of Wales.

Knight's writing sometimes involves "groups of men who are probably not the easiest people to fit into conventional society."

Directing
In addition to his writing, Knight has directed three films: Hummingbird (film)|Hummingbird (2013), starring Jason Statham, Locke (2014), starring Tom Hardy, and Serenity (2019) starring Matthew McConaughey, Diane Lane, and Anne Hathaway. Locke won a British Independent Film Award in 2013 for Best Screenplay. Knight has directed several episodes of the TV series for which he also frequently wrote, The Detectives.

In 2022, Knight was the co-director of the Opening Ceremony for the Birmingham 2022 Commonwealth Games, which took place on 28 July 2022.

TV series
Knight also co-created the TV series game show Who Wants to Be a Millionaire? (along with Mike Whitehill and David Briggs) and also is the creator of the TV series Show do Milhão  and All About Me.

Knight created the television series Peaky Blinders and has written for TV series including, BBC's Commercial Breakdown (with Jimmy Carr), The Detectives, Comedy Playhouse (the episode "Wild Oats" in 1993), Frankie's On..., Auntie's Big Bloomers, Taboo, and Canned Carrott.

He created and co-wrote A Christmas Carol, a dark adaptation of the Dickens story for BBC One in the UK and FX in the US, starring Guy Pearce as Scrooge and Andy Serkis as the Ghost of Christmas Past.

Filmography

Film

Television

Awards and honors

He was appointed Commander of the Order of the British Empire (CBE) in the 2020 New Year Honours for services to drama, entertainment and the community in Birmingham.

References

External links

Steven Knight's Peaky Blinders inspired luxury clothing brand Garrison Tailors
The Making of Locke: An Interview with Writer/Director Steve Knight, Part 1 at PostMovie.net
The Making of Locke: An Interview with Writer/Director Steve Knight, Part 2 at PostMovie.net

1959 births
Alumni of University College London
Best Screenplay Genie and Canadian Screen Award winners
British male television writers
Commanders of the Order of the British Empire
English film directors
English film producers
English male screenwriters
English television directors
English television producers
English television writers
Film directors from London
Film producers from London
Living people
Writers from Birmingham, West Midlands